Crescent moon may refer to:

Lunar phases
Fingernail moon, a lunar phase waxing until 7 days after or waning since 7 days before the new moon
Hilal (crescent moon), an Arabic term for the very slight crescent moon that is first visible after a new moon

Arts, entertainment, and media
Crescent Moon (comics), a fictional DC comics character
Crescent Moon (manga), the English title of the shōjo manga Mikan no Tsuki
"Crescent Moon" (song), Mika Nakashima's 2nd single
"Crescent Moon" (The Avengers), an episode of the television series The Avengers
Crescent Moon Darnel, nicknamed Cress, a character in The Lunar Chronicles by Marissa Meyer
The Crescent Moon, a 1913 collection of poetry by Rabindranath Tagore
The crescent moon featured in the logo for the English dub of Sailor Moon.

Other uses
Anjaneyasana, or crescent moon, an asana (body position) in yoga
Crescent Moon Society, a Chinese former literary society

See also

Crescent (disambiguation)
Demilune (disambiguation)
Half Moon (disambiguation)
Star and crescent, an iconographic symbol sometimes associated with Islam